Tell Kirri is an archaeological site in the Akkar plain, 3km northeast of Qoliate in the North Mohafazat (Governorate). It dates at least to the Neolithic.

References

Baalbek District
Neolithic settlements
Archaeological sites in Lebanon
Great Rift Valley